Aipichthys is an extinct genus of bony fish that is possibly polyphyletic.

Species
Five species have traditionally placed within Aipichthys, but a redescription of the type species in 2016 suggested the genus to be polyphyletic, with only the type species as a member of the genus.  The other four species were not moved out of the genus by the authors and were referred as `Aipichthys`.

Aipichthys pretiosus Steindachner, 1860 (Komen Limestone, Volčji Grad, Komen, Slovenia) (type species)
Aipichthys minor (Pictet, 1850) (Hakel and Hjoula, Lebanon)
Aipichthys nuchalis (Dixon, 1850) (Upper Cenomanian English Chalk, Washington, Sussex, UK)
Aipichthys oblongus Gayet, 1980 (Hakel and Hjoula, Lebanon)
Aipichthys velifer Woodward, 1901 (Hakel and Hjoula, Lebanon)

References

Polymixiiformes